JPC can refer to:
 Joint Parliamentary Committee in India
 JPC (emulator), Java PC
 JPC (retailer) a German web-retailer of Jazz, Pop und Classic and now also books
 The Johnson Publishing Company, publishers of Ebony and Jet magazines
Journal of Physics: Condensed Matter, formerly Journal of Physics C, a peer-reviewed scientific journal
 Joseph Priestley College a former further education college in Leeds, England
 Jesmond Parish Church in Newcastle upon Tyne, England
 John Paul College (Brisbane) in Queensland, Australia
 Junior Police Call, an organization founded by Hong Kong Police targeted at the youth
 John Paul McQueen and Craig Dean, a fictional gay couple in Hollyoaks